Aacharya Satyanarayana was born on 6 December 1947 in Ujjain, Madhya Pradesh, India. He is the founder of Meera Charitable Trust, which based in Jaipur, India. Additionally, he also established Meera Hospital in 1978. Satyanarayana is known to be a spiritual and motivational speaker who helped patients fight cancer by providing support in terms of financing, patients’ check up and early detection. He was also influential in spreading cancer awareness across India. Moreover, Satyanarayana has written many books on banking and has been awarded various honours.

Satyanarayana is often said to challenge one to "Think Beyond the Ordinary and Reach the Extraordinary." His lectures are said to highlight the synergistic relationship between age-old science and modern living. In the past, he has conducted seminars and delivered keynote speeches at various institutions, multinational corporations and social organizations.

Satyanarayana has a website dedicated to his work, beliefs, and ideas that he promotes.

Major works and experiences 
Through the medium of Meera Trust, Aacharya Satyanarayana has helped in the healing of the cancer patients and spread awareness of cancer disease across the country. He has also worked in UCO Bank as Probationary Officer in 1971. He has worked in different capacities which are as follows:
Faculty Member, Staff Training Center, Jaipur for 4 years.
Principal, Central Staff College, Calcutta for 2 years.
Principal, Regional Training Center, Jaipur for 1 year.
Sr. Branch Manager, Vidya Vihar, Pilani Branch for 3 years.
Honorary Professor in Personnel Management, Birla Institute of Technology & Science, Pilani for 3 years.
Enquiry Officer, Presenting Officer, & Investigating Officer for 6 years.
Officer in Divisional Office, Bhopal, Jaipur & Zonal Office, Jaipur for 11 years.

Aacharya Satyanarayana has also worked as District & Sessions Judge Court, Ujjain (M.P.) from 1964 to 1967. Called the 'Corporate Master' for his ability to apply spiritual truths to the management epitome, "Aacharya" is renowned for his motivational talks in the corporate world. He draws from world belief systems to address relevant questions of organizational challenges. He currently works as C.E.O. of Meera Hospital, Shiv Marg, Bani Park, Jaipur.

Aacharya Satyanarayana has worked as Honorary Professor in Personnel Management, at Birla Institute of Technology & Science, Pilani for 3 years.

Educational and professional qualification 
Education and professional qualification are as follows:
M. Com. Silver Medalist– Vikram University. Indira Gandhi, the then-Prime Minister of India, was present at the Convocation held in Feb. 1970.
C.A.I.I.B.– Part I in first attempt with Distinction in Accountancy and Part II – 27th rank all over India.
A.I.B– From Chartered Institute of Bankers, London and secured 1st position all over world & First Indian who won George Rae Prize for highest marks in Practice of Banking.
F.C.B.I.– From Life Fellow of the Chartered Institute of Bankers, London.
F.C.I.– From Fellow of the Institute of Commerce, London.
A.C.B.I.– From Associate of the Institute of Book-keepers & Related Data Processing, England.
A.I.M.M.– From Associate of the Indian Institute of Marketing & Management.
A.M.I.M.A.– From Associate of the All India Management Association and Life Member of the Indian Society for Training & Development.
He also holds a certificate in Industrial Finance from Indian Institute of Bankers, Mumbai and Banking Oriented Hindi.

Written texts 
Aacharya Satyanarayana is the author and co-author of many books. He has written and co-written:
Book on MCI Regulations 2002 and P.C. & P.N.D.P. Act
Practical Problems on Banking
701 Practical Letters for Bankers
Techniques of Credit Appraisal
2000 Objective Type Questions-Answer on Banking & Lending
Text Book for Banking Oriented paper in Hindi
Rural Economics for CAIIB Part – I
25 Years' Service Record Book
To prevent female foeticide know the M.T.P. Act, P.C.P.N.D.T. Act
Principles & Procedures for Claim Settlements in D.I.&C.G.C.I.(Co-written)
Elements of Economics & Structure of Indian Economy
Indian economics Problems (In Hindi)

See also 

Healthcare in India
Cancer research
Banking in India

References

Living people
Indian philanthropists
Year of birth missing (living people)